Harold Goodwin (December 1, 1902 – July 12, 1987) was an American actor who performed in over 225 films.

Biography
Goodwin began his film career at age 12. 

Goodwin's first starring role came in Oliver Twist, Jr. (1921). He also appeared as Jeff Brown in the 1927 Buster Keaton comedy College. He followed up with a role in another Keaton film The Cameraman in 1928, opposite Keaton and actress Marceline Day. Goodwin worked steadily through the silent film era and transitioned into the talkie era as a character actor, often as a "tough guy" because of his athletic stature. He was seen in the role of Detering in the 1930 Lewis Milestone-directed World War I drama All Quiet on the Western Front. His subsequent film roles were mostly small and uncredited.

In his later years Goodwin mainly acted in the Western film genre and often worked as a stuntman for film studios. In the 1960s, he made many guest appearances on the NBC television series Daniel Boone, starring Fess Parker and Ed Ames. Goodwin made his last film appearance in the low-budget horror film The Boy Who Cried Werewolf (1973) before retiring from the film industry.

Selected filmography

 The Ever Living Isles (1915, Short) – Wesley Hafley
 Old Heidelberg (1915) – Prince Karl, Age 12
 Little Miss Nobody (1916)
 The Sawdust Ring (1917) – Peter Weldon
 The Silent Man (1917) – David Bryce
 The Yellow Dog (1918)
 Set Free (1918) – Ronald Blair
 The Winning Girl (1919) – Jack Milligan
 Puppy Love (1919) – James Gordon Oliver
 Heart o' the Hills (1919) – Young Jason Honeycutt
 Suds (1920) – Benjamin Pillsbury Jones
 The Family Honor (1920) – The Grocer Boy
 Overland Red (1920) – Collie
 You Never Can Tell (1920) – Jimmy Flannery
 Sweet Lavender (1920) – Clem Hale
 Oliver Twist, Jr. (1921) – Oliver Twist Jr.
 Hearts of Youth (1921) – Ishmael Worth
 Lovetime (1921) – Pierre Lavone
 The Rosary (1922) – Skeeters Martin
 Tracked to Earth (1922) – Dick Jones
 Man to Man (1922) – Slim Barbee
 The Bearcat (1922) – Peter May
 Seeing's Believing (1922) – Hack Webster
 Kissed (1922) – Jim Kernochan
 The Bootlegger's Daughter (1922) – Violinist
 The Flirt (1922) – Jimmy Madison
 Kindled Courage (1923) – Hugh Paxton
 Alice Adams (1923) – Walter Adorns
 Burning Words (1923) – Ross Darby
 Broadway Gold (1923) – Page Poole
 The Ramblin' Kid (1923) – Skinny Rawlins
 The Wanters (1923) – Chauffeur
 Gentle Julia (1923) – Noble Dill
 Arizona Express (1924) – David Keith
 Hit and Run (1924) – Tex Adams
 That French Lady (1924) – Charlie Abbey
 Madonna of the Streets (1924) – Walter Bowman
 In Love with Love (1924) – Robert Metcalf
 Riders of the Purple Sage (1925) – Bern Venters
 The Talker (1925) – Lonnie Whinston
 The Midshipman (1925) – Tex
 Secret Orders (1926) – Eddie Delano
 The Flaming Frontier (1926) – Lawrence Stanwood
 The Honeymoon Express (1926) – Lance
 The Better 'Ole (1926) – Bert Chester – British Secret Service
 When a Dog Loves (1927) – James Alston
 Tarzan and the Golden Lion (1927) – Jack Bradley
 Snowbound (1927) – Joe Baird
 College (1927) – A Rival
 The Cheer Leader (1928) – Richard Crosby
 Her Summer Hero (1928) – Herb Darrow
 The Cameraman (1928) – Stagg
 The Divine Lady (1929) – Coach Driver who Kisses Emma (uncredited)
 Flight (1929) – Steve Roberts
 All Quiet on the Western Front (1930) – Detering
 The Widow from Chicago (1930) – Jimmy Henderson
 Dirigible (1930) – Hansen
 The Lawyer's Secret (1931) – 'Madame X'
 Pleasure (1931) – Lloyd
 Graft (1931) – 'Speed' Hansen
 Bad Company (1931) – Conway – Gangster (uncredited)
 Symphony of Six Million (1932) – Intern at Hospital (uncredited)
 Sky Bride (1932) – Wild Bill Adams
 Movie Crazy (1932) – Miller
 Hat Check Girl (1932) – Walter Marsh (uncredited)
 Hallelujah, I'm a Bum (1933) – Len (uncredited)
 Broadway Bad (1933) – A Reporter (uncredited)
 The Story of Temple Drake (1933) – Second Jellybean / Rejected Suitor (uncredited)
 The Girl in 419 (1933) – Doctor (uncredited)
 Strawberry Roan (1933) – Bart Hawkins
 Lone Cowboy (1933) – Hotel Clerk (uncredited)
 Smoking Guns (1934) – Hank Stone
 She Was a Lady (1934) – Yank
 Wagon Wheels (1934) – Nancy's Brother (uncredited)
 Romance in Manhattan (1935) – Doctor at Police Station (uncredited)
 Western Frontier (1935) – Morgan – Replaced by Beaumon
 The Crusades (1935) – Wounded Soldier (uncredited)
 Condemned to Live (1935) – Villager (uncredited)
 It's Up to You (1936) – Salesman
 The Dark Hour (1936) – Peter Blake
 Robin Hood of El Dorado (1936) – Slocum (uncredited)
 Roaming Lady (1936) – Reid's Pilot
 Counterfeit (1936) – Busch (uncredited)
 Theodora Goes Wild (1936) – Photographer at Governor's Reception (uncredited)
 Outcast (1937) – Party Guest (uncredited)
 A Fight to the Finish (1937) – Henry
 It Happened in Hollywood (1937) – Buck
 Love Takes Flight (1937) – Skipper (uncredited)
 Breakfast for Two (1937) – Joe – Blair's Chauffeur (uncredited)
 She Married an Artist (1937) – Reporter (uncredited)
 City Girl (1938) – Chaney's Aide (uncredited)
 Change of Heart (1938) – Caddy Master (uncredited)
 Happy Landing (1938) – Newspaper Reporter (uncredited)
 Start Cheering (1938) – Assistant Director (uncredited)
 Island in the Sky (1938) – Swede – Doyle's Henchman (uncredited)
 Kentucky Moonshine (1938) – Reporter (uncredited)
 Alexander's Ragtime Band (1938) – Military Policeman at Army Show (uncredited)
 One Wild Night (1938) – Newspaper Reporter (uncredited)
 Speed to Burn (1938) – Mug (uncredited)
 Always Goodbye (1938) – Chauffeur (uncredited)
 Sky Giant (1938) – Thompson's Partner (uncredited)
 Keep Smiling (1938) – Taxi Driver (uncredited)
 My Lucky Star (1938) – Cameraman
 Hold That Co-ed (1938) – News Photographer (uncredited)
 Just Around the Corner (1938) – Reporter (uncredited)
 Sharpshooters (1938) – Steward (uncredited)
 Road Demon (1938) – Louie – a Trucker (uncredited)
 While New York Sleeps (1938) – Harold – Reporter (uncredited)
 Jesse James (1939) – Bill
 Mr. Moto's Last Warning (1939) – Nightclub Bouncer / Seaman (uncredited)
 Mr. Moto in Danger Island (1939) – Ship Dispatch Officer (uncredited)
 Union Pacific (1939) – Calvin
 Boy Friend (1939) – Matchie Riggs
 Young Mr. Lincoln (1939) – Jeremiah Carter (uncredited)
 The Jones Family in Hollywood (1939)
 Second Fiddle (1939) – Pool Party Photographer (uncredited)
 News Is Made at Night (1939) – Simms (uncredited)
 Charlie Chan at Treasure Island (1939) – Airplane Steward (uncredited)
 Here I Am a Stranger (1939) – Chauffeur (uncredited)
 Hollywood Cavalcade (1939) – Prop Boy (uncredited)
 Pack Up Your Troubles (1939) – American Aviator (uncredited)
 Too Busy to Work (1939) – Raymond
 The Cisco Kid and the Lady (1939) – Barfly (uncredited)
 City of Chance (1940) – Dealer (uncredited)
 The Blue Bird (1940) – Hickory (uncredited)
 High School (1940) – Gangster (uncredited)
 Charlie Chan in Panama (1940) – Military Police Corporal (uncredited)
 Viva Cisco Kid (1940) – Hank Gunther
 Free, Blonde and 21 (1940) – Minor Role (uncredited)
 Shooting High (1940) – 3rd Crook (uncredited)
 Charlie Chan at the Wax Museum (1940) – Edwards
 Ragtime Cowboy Joe (1940) – Cattle Buyer Duncan
 Texas Rangers Ride Again (1940) – Ranger Comstock
 Michael Shayne, Private Detective (1940) – Reporter (uncredited)
 Buck Privates (1941) – Sergeant Leading Recruits Through Train Station (uncredited)
 Sleepers West (1941) – Railroad Detective (uncredited)
 The Cowboy and the Blonde (1941) – Cameraman (uncredited)
 Forced Landing (1941) – Petchnikoff
 Accent on Love (1941) – Policeman (uncredited)
 Tanks a Million (1941) – Lt. Caldwell
 You'll Never Get Rich (1941) – Capt. Nolan (uncredited)
 Great Guns (1941) – Army Captain (uncredited)
 International Lady (1941) – Decoder on Piano (uncredited)
 Cadet Girl (1941) – Sergeant (uncredited)
 Hay Foot (1942) – Lieutenant Caldwell
 Brooklyn Orchid (1942) – Taxi Dispatcher (uncredited)
 Quiet Please, Murder (1942) – Stover (uncredited)
 He Hired the Boss (1943) – Hank (uncredited)
 She Gets Her Man (1945) – Winning Companion (uncredited)
 Salome Where She Danced (1945) – San Francisco Sheriff (uncredited)
 That Night with You (1945) – Robertson – Party Guest (uncredited)
 Frontier Gal (1945) – Deputy (uncredited)
 The Scarlet Horseman (1946, Serial) – Idaho Jones
 The Runaround (1946) – Detective Lund (uncredited)
 Lover Come Back (1946) – Reporter at Party (uncredited)
 Don't Gamble with Strangers (1946) – John Sanders
 Slave Girl (1947) – Captive Sailor (uncredited)
 Ride the Pink Horse (1947) – Red
 Here Comes Trouble (1948) – Reporter with Cigars (uncredited)
 The Bold Frontiersman (1948) – Poker Player #1
 Carson City Raiders (1948) – Dave Starky
 River Lady (1948) – Larson (uncredited)
 Kiss the Blood Off My Hands (1948) – Whipper (uncredited)
 Family Honeymoon (1948) – Guide (uncredited)
 Bad Boy (1949) – Gambler (uncredited)
 The Lady Gambles (1949) – Westerner (uncredited)
 Law of the Golden West (1949) – Northerner in bar
 The Wyoming Bandit (1949) – Sheriff
 Tokyo Joe (1949) – Maj. J.F.X. Loomis (uncredited)
 Radar Patrol vs. Spy King (1949, Serial) – Miller, Power Station Mgr. [Ch. 7]
 Woman in Hiding (1950) – State Trooper (uncredited)
 The Great Rupert (1950) – Callahan – FBI Man
 The Kid from Texas (1950) – Matt Curtis
 The Vanishing Westerner (1950) – Howard Glumm
 I Was a Shoplifter (1950) – San Diego Sheriff (uncredited)
 The Invisible Monster (1950, Serial) – Kirk – Body-Shop Henchman [Ch.11] (uncredited)
 Desperadoes of the West (1950, Serial) – Sheriff (uncredited)
 Wyoming Mail (1950) – Cowboy (uncredited)
 The Misadventures of Buster Keaton (1950) – (uncredited)
 Abbott and Costello Meet the Invisible Man (1951) – Bartender (uncredited)
 The Last Outpost (1951) – Union Sergeant (uncredited)
 Ma and Pa Kettle Back on the Farm (1951) – Train Conductor (uncredited)
 Comin' Round the Mountain (1951) – Mountaineer
 Cattle Drive (1951) – Waiter (uncredited)
 Double Dynamite (1951) – Police Lieutenant (uncredited)
 Here Come the Nelsons (1952) – Minor Role (uncredited)
 The Blazing Forest (1952) – Mac, Injured Lumberjack (uncredited)
 The Redhead from Wyoming (1953) – Chet's Henchman (uncredited)
 Abbott and Costello Go to Mars (1953) – Dr. Coleman (uncredited)
 Ma and Pa Kettle on Vacation (1953) – U.S. Agent Harriman (uncredited)
 Calamity Jane (1953) – Poker Player (uncredited)
 Ride Clear of Diablo (1954) – Bartender (uncredited)
 Black Horse Canyon (1954) – Cowhand (uncredited)
 Black Tuesday (1954) – Fire Commissioner (uncredited)
 Abbott and Costello Meet the Keystone Kops (1955) – Cameraman
 Ma and Pa Kettle at Waikiki (1955) – Dr. Barnes (uncredited)
 Walk the Proud Land (1956) – Telegrapher (uncredited)
 Showdown at Abilene (1956) – Cattleman (uncredited)
 Joe Butterfly (1957) – Colonel Hopper
 Night Passage (1957) – Pick Gannon
 Step Down to Terror (1958) – Man with Dog (uncredited)
 No Name on the Bullet (1959) – Wilson – Bank Clerk (uncredited)
 It Started with a Kiss (1959) – Guard (uncredited)
 The Leech Woman (1960) – Detective Joe (uncredited)
 Portrait in Black (1960) – Patrolman (uncredited)
 Spartacus (1960) – Slave (uncredited)
 Go Naked in the World (1961) – George – the Bartender (uncredited)
 Experiment in Terror (1962) – Truck Driver (uncredited)
 Move Over, Darling (1963) – Bailiff (uncredited)
 The Brass Bottle (1964) – Van Driver (uncredited)
 Shock Treatment (1964) – Library Clerk (uncredited)
 The Comedy Man (1964) – Art Baldwin (uncredited)
 Morituri (1965) – Merchant Marine (uncredited)
 The Boy Who Cried Werewolf (1973) – Mr. Duncan (final film role)

References

Bibliography
 John Holmstrom, The Moving Picture Boy: An International Encyclopaedia from 1895 to 1995, Norwich, Michael Russell, 1996, p. 20.

External links

 

1902 births
1987 deaths
Male Western (genre) film actors
American male film actors
American male silent film actors
American male television actors
Actors from Peoria, Illinois
American male child actors
20th-century American male actors
American stunt performers